Harold Stuart Ferguson M.B.E. (10 February 1851 – 5 January 1921) was a Scottish zoologist who worked in the south Indian princely state of Travancore, contributing to the local museum.

Family
He was born in Park Street, near Grosvenor Square, London, the fourth child of Robert Ferguson (1799–1865) and Mary Mcleod of Skye. His father was born in India, a close friend of Sir John Macpherson, Governor-General of India, and Sir Walter Scott. Robert was an eminent physician who also took an interest in insects, literature and other matters becoming Physician Extraordinary to Queen Victoria. Harold spent most of his life in India in Travancore.

He was married to Isabel Julia Maxwell, niece of Field Marshal Lord Roberts and daughter of Colonel Hamilton Maxwell of the Bengal Staff Corps.

Military career
He joined the Royal Artillery and around the mid-1880s was a lieutenant in command of the Nair Brigade of the Rajah of Travancore.

Sporting career
He made two appearances for the Scottish XI against England in the football pseudo-internationals in 1871 and 1872.

Career as zoologist
He was connected to the State Museum at Trivandrum from 1880 onwards, and from 1894 until his retirement from India in 1904 was director of the museum. Ferguson was interested in all aspects of natural history of the region and he contributed to the herpetology of the state.

He became a member of the British Ornithologists' Union in 1886 and was elected a fellow of the Zoological Society in 1891. He is commemorated in the scientific name of a species of Indian snake, Rhinophis fergusonianus. Ferguson's toad Bufo scaber is named after him. He discovered a species of butterfly endemic to the southern Western Ghats, the Travancore evening brown butterfly (Parantirrhoea marshalli ) as well as Mycalesis oculus.

He contributed numerous specimens to the collections of the British Museum.

References

Other sources
 Travancore museum
 Public gardens of Travancore

External links
Obituary in "Nature"

1851 births
1921 deaths
British herpetologists
England v Scotland representative footballers (1870–1872)
Members of the Order of the British Empire
People educated at Eton College
Naturalists of British India
Association footballers not categorized by position
Association football players not categorized by nationality